The simple station Puente Largo is part of the TransMilenio mass-transit system of Bogotá, Colombia, which opened in the year 2000.

Location
The station is located in northwestern Bogotá, specifically on Avenida Suba with Transversal 44.

It serves the Puente Largo, Ilarco, and Andes Norte neighborhoods.

Nearby is the Fray Bartolomé de las Casas medical center.

History

In 2006, phase two of the TransMilenio system was completed, including the Avenida Suba line, on which this station is located.

The station is named Puente Largo due to the neighborhood located to its east.

Station Services

Main Line Service

Feeder routes

This station does not have connections to feeder routes.

Inter-city service

This station does not have inter-city service.

External links
TransMilenio

See also
Bogotá
TransMilenio
List of TransMilenio Stations

TransMilenio